Stóra Dímun is an island in the southern Faroe Islands, sometimes only referred to as Dímun. It is accessible by sea only during periods of clear and calm weather, but there is a regular helicopter service twice a week all year. There is a lighthouse on the island.

Etymology

The name 'Stóra Dímun' means 'Great Dimun', in contrast to 'Lítla Dímun' or 'Little Dimun'. According to the Faroese placename expert Jakobsen, 'Dimun' may represent a pre-Norse, Celtic placename element, with 'di' representing 'two'.   Stora and Litla Dímun shows a pairing of two distinctive but separate localities in one name. Gammeltoft concluded Dímun is a Scandinavian place name for a double-peaked feature of a particular appearance, reflecting a linguistic contact between Scandinavians and Gaels.

Population
Before 1920, the ruins of an old church were present, but these no longer exist. There are two peaks on Stóra Dímun: Høgoyggj (396 metres; 1300') and Klettarnir (308 metres; 1010'). The island was once home to many families from the 13th century onwards, but now only two families of seven make their home on the island.

The Farm 
There is only one farm at the Southside of the island, and it constitutes its only settlement. The farm benefits from soil that has been fertilized by the guano of millions of seabirds for thousands of years. This gives excellent grazing for the 450 ewes that the island supports. The farm is famed for their turnips and sheepskin, of which they produce some 300-400 each year.

Six to eight calves are slaughtered every year.

There is some tourism during the summer months.

Important bird area
The island has been identified as an Important Bird Area by BirdLife International because of its significance as a breeding site for seabirds, especially European storm petrels (15,000 pairs), Atlantic puffins (40,000 pairs) and black guillemots (50 pairs).

See also
 Faroese puffin

Gallery

References

Secondary sources

External links 
  
 Personal website with aerial photos

Islands of the Faroe Islands
Important Bird Areas of the Faroe Islands
Populated places in the Faroe Islands